The Roman Catholic Diocese of Ibiza is a diocese located in the city of Ibiza in the Ecclesiastical province of Valencia in Spain.

History
 30 April 1782: Established as Diocese of Ibiza from the Metropolitan Archdiocese of Tarragona
 1851: Suppressed to the Diocese of Majorca
 1927: Restored as Apostolic Administration of Ibiza from the Diocese of Majorca
 1949: Promoted as Diocese of Ibiza

Leadership
 Bishops of Ibiza (Roman rite)
 Manuel Abad y Lasierra (18 Jul 1783 – 28 Sep 1787 )
 Eustaquio Azara, O.S.B. (7 Apr 1788 – 12 Sep 1794 )
 Blas Jacobo Beltrán (26 Jun 1805 – 10 Jul 1815 )
 Felipe González Abarca, O. de M. (22 Jul 1816 – 30 Aug 1829 )
 Basilio Antonio Carrasco Hernando, O. de M. (26 Mar 1831 – 4 Apr 1852 )
 Salvio Huix Miralpeix, titular bishop of Selymbria and Apostolic administrator (16 Feb 1928 - 28 January 1935), afterwards Bishop of Lerida
 Antonio Cardona Riera, Apostolic administrator (1935 - 1950), subsequently Bishop (2 Feb 1950 – 28 Mar 1960 )
 Francisco Planas Muntaner (28 Mar 1960 – 10 Sep 1976 )
 José Gea Escolano (10 Sep 1976 – 15 May 1987 )
 Manuel Ureña Pastor (8 Jul 1988 – 23 Jul 1991 )
 Javier Salinas Viñals (26 May 1992 – 5 Sep 1997 )
 Agustín Cortés Soriano (20 Feb 1998 – 15 Jun 2004)
 Vicente Juan Segura (22 Jan 2005 – 18 Jan 2020 Appointed, Auxiliary Bishop of Valencia)
 Vicente Ribas Prats (13 Oct 2021 – present)

See also
 Roman Catholicism in Spain

References

Sources
 Catholic Hierarchy
  Diocese website

Roman Catholic dioceses in Spain
Christian organizations established in 1927
Ibiza
Religious organizations established in 1782
1782 establishments in Spain